The Giant Mountain Wilderness Area, an Adirondack Park unit of New York's Forest Preserve, lies in Essex County, New York, in the towns of Elizabethtown and Keene. It is roughly bounded by NY 9N on the north, NY 73 on the west and south and US 9 on the east. It includes two bodies of water covering 5 acres (2 ha), 12.5 miles (20 km) of trails, and a single lean-to.

Geography

The Giant Mountain Wilderness Area topography is steep and rocky with a considerable number of vertical or near vertical cliffs. Repeated landslides have occurred on the west side of Giant, exposing bare rock. Numerous small brooks cascade from the upper slopes. The tops of the higher mountains are bare rock but aspen, white birch, balsam and spruce are slowly filling in the upper slopes.

From the eastern boundary of Route 9 several miles south of Elizabethtown to the top of Giant Mountain represents a horizontal distance of about six miles (9.6 km), with an elevation change of nearly 4,000 feet (1,219 m), the greatest elevation change per horizontal mile over that distance of any Adirondack Park wilderness area.

Forest

During 1903 one of the major forest fires of the Adirondacks swept over the greater part of this area, burning the topsoil down to bare rock and leaving the two dominant mountains of this area, Giant and Rocky Peak Ridge, practically bald. A few pockets on the lower slopes escaped the intense burn and are easily distinguishable as they now contain old growth white pine and hemlock stands with some mixed hardwoods.

Because of the great difference in temperatures and soil conditions between these two elevations, the forest cover type ranges from stunted spruce, balsam and white birch near the mountain tops to excellent quality oak, maple, basswood and white ash at the lower elevations. There are also some excellent stands of hemlock on the Keene Valley side near the Ausable River.

Water

Giant's Washbowl lies in a small depression near the 2,300-foot (700 m) level on the lower south slope of Giant Mountain and has a surface area of about five acres (2 ha). The tarn near the summit of Rocky Peak Ridge has been referred to locally by a number of different names, but a sign appeared in the early 1970s with the name "Lake Marie Louise." The sharp col, referred to as Gusty Gap, between Giant Mountain and Rocky Peak Ridge is another attractive feature of the area.

Many small brooks cascade down from the upper slopes and one in particular, Roaring Brook, has a scenic waterfall which may be seen from Route 73, about one mile (1.6 km) north of Chapel Pond. A number of similar brooks in the area provide scenic spots as well as trout fishing pools.

Recreation

The area is a popular hiking destination throughout the year with Giant Mountain, the Nubble, and Rocky Peak Ridge offering broad views over the area. All 3 of these excursions can be reached starting at the Giant Mountain Trailhead located roadside on NY 73.

Climbing

The area has a number of cliffs which are accessible from NY 73 and popular with climbers.  Roaring Brook Falls is a popular ice climbing route in winter.

See also
 List of Wilderness Areas in the Adirondack Park

References
 Adirondack Park Agency. "Adirondack State Land Master Plan", Updated 2001. 

Wilderness areas in Adirondack Park
U.S. Route 9
Protected areas of Essex County, New York